Michael Franz Lappert (31 December 1928 – 28 March 2014) was a Czech-born British inorganic chemist. Mainly located at the University of Sussex, he was recognized for contributions to organometallic complexes.

Early life and education
Lappert was born in Czechoslovakia and came to the UK as a Kindertransport refugee. He received his PhD in 1951 at the Northern Polytechnic, London.

Career and research
His areas of research often included studies on low coordination numbers and metal amido complexes.

Awards and honours
Lappert was elected as a Fellow of the Royal Society (FRS) in 1979.

References

1928 births
2014 deaths
Inorganic chemists
British chemists
Fellows of the Royal Society